House of Sweden is a building in Washington, D.C., in which is located the Embassy of Sweden and the diplomatic missions of the Republic of Iceland and the Principality of Liechtenstein to the United States. The building is located at 2900 K Street N.W. in the Georgetown neighborhood.

Apart from the embassies, the building, which is owned by the Swedish state through its National Property Board, also houses representatives of Swedish commerce. Facilities includes a secretariat, exhibition space, 19 corporate office suites, and a high-tech business event center.

Building
The building was designed by the Swedish architects Gert Wingårdh and Tomas Hansen, with VOA Associates in Washington, D.C., as architect of record. The front of the building is glass. Construction began in August 2004 and completed in the summer of 2006. The embassy moved into the building at the beginning of August 2006. Previously the embassy was housed in rented space, first at Watergate 600, and later at 1501 M Street N.W.

The House of Sweden is designed in the modernist style, with many Scandinavian design elements; in addition to glass, the building features use of white stone and blond maple materials.

The building was inaugurated on October 23, 2006, by King Carl XVI Gustaf and Queen Silvia. Also present at the inauguration were Minister for Foreign Affairs Carl Bildt and Ambassador of Sweden to the United States Gunnar Lund. The Swedish rock band The Ark performed at the ceremony.

Gert Wingårdh received the Swedish national architecture award—the Kasper Salin Prize—for House of Sweden in 2007.

See also
 Diplomatic missions of Sweden
 Iceland–United States relations
 List of ambassadors of Sweden to the United States
 Liechtenstein–United States relations
 Sweden–United States relations
 Architecture of Washington, D.C.

References

External links

House of Sweden
Embassy of Sweden
Embassy of Iceland

Sweden
Washington, D.C.
Washington, D.C.
Iceland–United States relations
Liechtenstein–United States relations
Sweden–United States relations
Buildings and structures completed in 2006
Gert Wingårdh buildings
Georgetown (Washington, D.C.)
2006 establishments in Washington, D.C.